Rolf Fuchs was an East German luger who competed in the mid-1960s. He won the bronze medal in the men's doubles event at the 1965 FIL World Luge Championships in Davos, Switzerland.

External links
Hickok sports information on World champions in luge and skeleton.

German male lugers
Possibly living people
Year of birth missing